The Necropolis of Monte Luna is an archaeological site located in the surroundings of Senorbì, in Sardinia, near a hill known as Monte Luna. Excavations at this site have unveiled the remainders of a Carthaginian necropolis, comprising about 120 graves. The necropolis was built by the inhabitants of a Carthaginian settlement in the area of modern Santu Teru around the 6th century BC.

Footnotes

Buildings and structures completed in the 6th century BC
Archaeological sites in Sardinia
Buildings and structures in Sardinia
Carthage
Phoenician funerary practices
Necropoleis